Manorathavarman was a king of early Champa, reigning approximately around the fifth century AD in the Thu Bồn River Valley. 

He was a nephew of Gangaraja. His next successor in the dynastic line was Rudravarman I (r. 527-572), descending through Manorathavarman's sister line.

He was mentioned by Chinese annals as Fan Wendi (Chinese: 范文敌, pinyin: Fàn Wéndí).

References 

Kings of Champa
5th-century monarchs in Asia